The next elections to the Parliament of Jamaica are scheduled for 2025.

Background 
Minister of Legal and Constitutional Affairs Marlene Malahoo Forte said that Jamaica would transition to being a Republic before the next general election.

Electoral system 
The 63 members of the House of Representatives are elected in single-member constituencies by first-past-the-post voting. Voters must be 18 years and over and be a citizen of Jamaica or a Commonwealth citizen.

The leader of the party commanding a majority of support in the House of Representatives is called on by the Governor General to form a government as Prime Minister, while the leader of the largest group or coalition not in government becomes the Leader of the Opposition.

Opinion polls

References 

2020s in Jamaica
Elections in Jamaica
Future elections in the Caribbean